A statue of George Washington stands in Mexico City. It was presented as a gift to the city by the United States government in 1916.

Since 1970, it has been located in the Parque Rosario Castellanos.

An earlier sculpture of Washington by Pompeo Coppini in the same city was destroyed in 1914.

See also
 List of statues of George Washington
 List of sculptures of presidents of the United States

References 

Chapultepec
Sculptures of men in Mexico
Statues in Mexico City
Statues of George Washington
1916 establishments in Mexico
Monuments and memorials in Mexico City